Port Arthur was an electoral riding in Ontario, Canada. In 1902 the riding was created as Port Arthur and Rainy River. Six years later it was split into two ridings: Port Arthur and Rainy River. In 1996, it was merged with the riding of Nipigon to form Thunder Bay—Superior North.

When the city of Port Arthur merged with the neighbouring city of Fort William in 1970 to create the current city of Thunder Bay, the riding of Port Arthur and the riding Fort William continued as separate districts serving the new city.

Members of Provincial Parliament

Election results

References

Former provincial electoral districts of Ontario